Claudia Nicula (born October 12, 1973) is a Romanian sprint canoer who competed in the early 1990s. She finished fourth in the K-4 500 m event at the 1992 Summer Olympics in Barcelona.

References
Sports-Reference.com profile

External links

1973 births
Canoeists at the 1992 Summer Olympics
Living people
Olympic canoeists of Romania
Romanian female canoeists
Place of birth missing (living people)